Free-for-All is the second studio album by American hard rock musician Ted Nugent. It was released in October 1976 by Epic Records, and was his first album to go platinum.

Background
As the recording of Free-for-All commenced, rhythm guitarist and lead vocalist Derek St. Holmes left the band, citing growing personal and creative conflicts with Nugent. Two solid years of living together on the road had taken its toll on the relationship. Additionally, St. Holmes was unhappy with Tom Werman's production, saying that the producer was watering down the band's sound.

A full year before Bat Out of Hell brought him international success, vocalist Meat Loaf was brought in by producer Werman to sing on the album. Meat Loaf was paid the sum of $1,000 for his contributions to the album, which included crafting his vocal arrangements and two days of recording sessions. He says that after he agreed to do the album he was sent a lyric sheet containing just the words with no arrangements. Having no idea what the songs were going to sound like, he then created the vocal arrangements for the songs during the two days of recording.

St. Holmes also sang lead vocal on several of the album's songs, including the single "Dog Eat Dog". He officially returned to the group after Free-for-Alls release, and performed on the subsequent tour. Band management asked him to return at the request of Epic Records.

Track listing
All songs written by Ted Nugent, except where noted; all songs arranged by Nugent, Rob Grange, Derek St. Holmes and Cliff Davies.

Personnel
Band members
 Ted Nugent – lead and rhythm guitar, lead vocals (tracks 1 and 10), percussion, bass guitar (track 2)
 Meat Loaf – lead vocals (tracks 3, 5, 6, 8 and 9)
 Rob Grange – bass guitar, bass phase effects
 Cliff Davies – drums, percussion, backing vocals (track 2), producer

Additional musicians
 Derek St. Holmes – lead vocals (tracks 2, 4, 7, 11 and 12), rhythm guitar (tracks 2, 10 & 11)
 Steve McRay – keyboards, backing vocals
 Tom Werman – percussion, producer

Production
 Lew Futterman – producer
 Anthony Reale – engineer
 Tim Geelan – mixing engineer
 Paula Scher – album design
 Jim Houghton – photography
 Bruce Dickinson – 1999 reissue producer
 Vic Anesini – remastering
 Stephan Moore – 1999 reissue project director
 Howard Fritzson – 1999 reissue art director
 Gary Graff – 1999 reissue liner notes

Charts

Weekly charts

Singles

Certifications

References

1976 albums
Ted Nugent albums
Epic Records albums
Albums produced by Tom Werman